Vasco is a two-part EP by Ricardo Villalobos. It was released by Perlon on LP and CD in the spring and fall of 2008. The original 12" vinyl pressings include "Minimoonstar", "Electronic Water" and "Amazordum", alongside remixes of each song by Shackleton, San Proper and Baby Ford. The CD release discards the remixes, but adds "Skinfummel" and the full 32 minutes of "Minimoonstar", extending the song by over twice its length.

Track listing
Vinyl pressing - Part One

Vinyl pressing - Part Two

CD pressing

Credits
 Ricardo Villalobos - writer, producer, main performer
 Rashad Becker - mastering
 Double Standard - sleeve artwork

References

2008 albums
Ricardo Villalobos albums